Zaboršt is a Slovene place name that may refer to:

Zaboršt, Domžale, a village in the Municipality of Domžale, central Slovenia
Zaboršt, Kostanjevica na Krki, a village in the Municipality of Kostanjevica na Krki, southeastern Slovenia
Zaboršt, Škocjan, a village in the Municipality of Škocjan, southeastern Slovenia
Zaboršt pri Dolu, a village in the Municipality of Dol pri Ljubljani, central Slovenia
Zaboršt pri Šentvidu, a village in the Municipality of Ivančna Gorica, southeastern Slovenia